Podvolochye is the name of several rural localities in Russia:
Podvolochye, Arkhangelsk Oblast, a village in Tarasovsky Selsoviet of Plesetsky District of Arkhangelsk Oblast
Podvolochye, Kirov Oblast, a village in Istobensky Rural Okrug of Orichevsky District of Kirov Oblast
Podvolochye, Kostroma Oblast, a village in Belkovskoye Settlement of Vokhomsky District of Kostroma Oblast
Podvolochye, Pyzhugsky Selsoviet, Kichmengsko-Gorodetsky District, Vologda Oblast, a village in Pyzhugsky Selsoviet of Kichmengsko-Gorodetsky District of Vologda Oblast
Podvolochye, Shestakovsky Selsoviet, Kichmengsko-Gorodetsky District, Vologda Oblast, a village in Shestakovsky Selsoviet of Kichmengsko-Gorodetsky District of Vologda Oblast
Podvolochye, Verkhneyentalsky Selsoviet, Kichmengsko-Gorodetsky District, Vologda Oblast, a village in Verkhneyentalsky Selsoviet of Kichmengsko-Gorodetsky District of Vologda Oblast
Podvolochye, Pokrovsky Selsoviet, Velikoustyugsky District, Vologda Oblast, a village in Pokrovsky Selsoviet of Velikoustyugsky District of Vologda Oblast
Podvolochye, Verkhneshardengsky Selsoviet, Velikoustyugsky District, Vologda Oblast, a village in Verkhneshardengsky Selsoviet of Velikoustyugsky District of Vologda Oblast